Seethangoli is a small village located 11 km north of Kasaragod town and 18 km south of Uppala in Kasaragod District, Kerala, India.

History
The village of Seethangoli is in the shape of a finger ring. According to local traditions, when the Sri Lankan demon Ravana abducted the Indian goddess Sitadevi, a ring fell down from her hand and became a village in that shape. So it is called 'Seethangoli' or Seeth's 'Anguli,' or ring.

Notable people
Anil Kumble, former captain and the former coach of Indian national cricket team takes his last name, indicating ancestry or family origins, from this town. Recently, one of the Main Road to Govt Hospital was renamed as Anil Kumble Road in a function conducted by Kumble Panchayat.

Important Organizations
 Hindustan Aeronautical Limited
 Malik Deenar MBA College, Seethamgoly

 Malik Deenar College of Pharmacy, Seethangoli
 Khansa College for advanced  studies, Narayanamangalam
 Muhimmathul Muslimeen Education Centre, Puthige

Image gallery

See also 
 Kattathadka
Uppala
Perla
Kasaragod District
Kanipura Sri Gopalakrishna Temple
Ananthapura Lake Temple

References

External links

 Kumbla Town

Suburbs of Kasaragod
Villages in Kasaragod district